The Munich Art Theatre (Münchner Künstlertheater) was the first German theater constructed in the art nouveau style. It was designed by Max Littmann and opened in 1908.

The main initiator was the journalist and dramatist Georg Fuchs, who in 1907 founded a society in Munich, the Verein Münchner Künstlertheater, with the expressed aim of building a theatre according to ‘artistic principles’.

The theatre was built with a shallow stage, apron, and no orchestra pit.

Seats were arranged in an amphitheatre form.

The most innovative feature was the ‘relief stage’ where the performers acted before a stylized backdrop.

Although the first productions coordinated by Fuchs were not particularly successful, the building and the relief stage attracted a good deal of attention.

In 1909 it was leased to Max Reinhardt and finally closed in 1914.

The building was destroyed during Second World War bombing.

References 

Art Nouveau architecture in Munich
Buildings and structures completed in 1908
Buildings and structures in Germany destroyed during World War II
Former theatres in Germany
Theatres in Munich